Viola "Vi" June (July 20, 1932 - August 2020) was a city councilor, mayor, state representative, and columnist in Colorado. She served as mayor of Westminster, Colorado, and was the first woman to hold the office. She was born in Minnesota. She served eight years in the Colorado House from 1991 to 1998.

Viola Helen Beste was born in Sauk Centre, Minnesota. She studied at St. Cloud State University for one year before moving to Denver, Colorado for a job at Gates Rubber. She was married for 60 years and had six children.

References

Democratic Party members of the Colorado House of Representatives
Women city councillors in Colorado
1932 births
2020 deaths
St. Cloud State University alumni
20th-century American politicians
People from Westminster, Colorado
Women state legislators in Colorado
Mayors of places in Colorado
20th-century American women politicians
Women mayors of places in Colorado
People from Sauk Centre, Minnesota